Michel Daeron is a film maker, writer and director.

Background
Among his works is Moruroa Le Grand Secret which tells of the French nuclear tests in Moruroa and the effects of them on the people.

Description of works
Atlantic Drift is about Schlomo Haendel who travels to Mauritius to find out what had happened to his father, a Jew who 50 years earlier escaped Germany and was deported to Mauritius and imprisoned there.

Unforgotten Islands is about the people of Diego Garcia. 
 John Pilger has also made a film about the plight of the people of Diego Garcia, Stealing a Nation (2004).

Moruroa Le Grand Secret is about the French nuclear tests and the effects on the Polynesian people (Moruroa is the native Tahitian name instead of Mururoa, used by the French army)

Filmography

Director
 April Moon 2.0 - 2018
 Unforgotten Islands - 2011
 Il était une île, Diego Garcia (Once Upon an Island, Diego Garcia) - 2008
 Atlantic Drift – 2002
 Bach in Auschwitz – 1999
 Les tondues de la Libération - 1995
 Contre-jour de Sibérie - 1993
 Moruroa, le grand secret (Moruroa, the Big Secret)− 1993
 April Moon over Canala - 1989

Writer
 Atlantic Drift – 2002
 Bach in Auschwitz – 1999

Links
 Moruroa, le grand secret (videorecording) = Moruroa, the big secret / un film de Michel Daeron.
 Official site : Michel Daeron

References

1957 births
Film directors from Paris
French male screenwriters
French screenwriters
Living people